"Midnight Rain" is a song by American singer-songwriter Taylor Swift, taken from her tenth original studio album, Midnights (2022). Written and produced by Swift and Jack Antonoff, the song has a slow pace, R&B-tinged electropop production. It is driven by a distorted Moog synthesizer and features Swift's low-pitched vocals at some parts. In the lyrics, the narrator contemplates on a lost love and how she chose her career and fame over a domestic life with an ex-lover.

In reviews of Midnights, some critics found the track captivating and interesting, praising the vocally manipulated hook and nuanced production. A few others found the vocal production off-putting. "Midnight Rain" peaked at number five on both the Billboard Hot 100 and Global 200, and charted within the top 10 in Australia, Canada, Malaysia, India, the Philippines, Portugal, Singapore, and Vietnam. The track was certified gold by the Australian Recording Industry Association (ARIA), silver by the British Phonographic Industry (BPI), and platinum by Music Canada (MC). Swift included "Midnight Rain" on the set list of the Eras Tour (2023).

Background 
On August 28, 2022, during her acceptance speech for Video of the Year for All Too Well: The Short Film at the 2022 MTV Video Music Awards, singer-songwriter Taylor Swift announced her tenth studio album, set for release on October 21, 2022. Soon after, Swift revealed the name of the album, Midnights, and its cover, accompanied with a premise, on social networks. The track-list was not immediately revealed. Jack Antonoff, a musician who has worked with Swift since 1989 (2014), was revealed as one of the producers of the album through a video she posted on her Instagram account on September 6, 2022, titled, "The making of Midnights". On September 21, about a month before the album's release, Swift announced a thirteen episode series called Midnights Mayhem with Me that will be released on the social media platform TikTok, and in each episode the name of one track from the album will be revealed. In the fourth episode on September 28, 2022, Swift announced the title of the sixth track as "Midnight Rain".

Composition and lyrics 

"Midnight Rain" is two minutes and 54 seconds long. It is an electropop tune with an R&B and electro-hip-hop-inflected production. Driven by a distorted Moog synthesizer, the track incorporates dubstep-influenced bass, and house/trap-oriented, indie pop beats. It begins by featuring Swift's vocals pitched down and manipulated by Auto-Tune, and then transitions back to Swift's normal singing voice. According to Billboard critic Jason Lipshutz, the vocal shifts act as a call and response between the song's narrator and subject. Mikael Wood of the Los Angeles Times described the song as "slow [and] woozy". Some critics compared the song's production, specifically the vocal manipulation, to Antonoff's work on Lorde's 2017 album Melodrama.

In the lyrics, the narrator contemplates on a lost love that she left back in her hometown and how she chose her career and fame over a domestic life; "He wanted comfortable/ I wanted that pain/ He wanted a bride/ I was making my own name." Towards the conclusion, the narrator reflects on her indecision, "I guess sometimes we all get some kind of haunted/ And I never think of him except on midnights like this." For The A.V. Club journalist Saloni Gajjar, the song's theme of leaving a small-town lover behind harkens back to Swift's track "Champagne Problems" from her 2020 album Evermore. Some critics consider "Midnight Rain" to be the album's centerpiece and comment that it best sums up Swift's concept of "13 sleepless nights". For Esquire journalist Alex Bilmes, the lyrics reflect Swift's contemplation on her own career path, "the determination, ambition, and sacrifices that got her to such rarefied altitude".

Critical reception 
In the Associated Press, Elise Ryan found "Midnight Rain" to be a strong showcase of Swift's lyrical abilities for displaying "her unparalleled ability to make any emotion feel universal" and selected the track as one of the album's most sonically interesting. Gajjar and Neil McCormick of The Daily Telegraph also picked it as one the album's highlights. In a review for Vulture, Craig Jenkins deemed "Midnight Rain", among select Midnights tracks, to be indicative of Swift's abilities to create an R&B-tinged album, "a mannered genre reset constantly threatening to cut in an alluring new direction". Spin critic Bobby Olivier found the vocal manipulation to be "well executed, [...] landing an uncharacteristically soulful smolder". Also praising the vocal production, Spencer Kornhaber of The Atlantic found that the "oozing and panning noises" "conjure a feeling of suspended time". Lipshutz ranked it fifth on a ranking of all 13 Midnights tracks; "that woozy hook is rock-solid [...], and when Swift eventually adopts the refrain in her own voice, the words cut through with righteous clarity, and greater power."

Some critics were not entirely impressed with the production. The New York Times Jon Caramanica opined that the production resembles the music of other artists such as the Weeknd and does not suit Swift. For Paul Attard from Slant Magazine, Antonoff's composition was somewhat redundant. In Consequence, Mary Siroky said the vocal manipulation overwhelms the song and picked "Midnight Rain" as one of the album's missteps.

Commercial performance 
Upon Midnights release, "Midnight Rain" debuted at its peak number five on the US Billboard Hot 100 with 36.9 million streams, 2,200 downloads, and 449,000 airplay impressions. The song along nine others made Swift the first artist to occupy the top 10 of the Hot 100 and the woman with the most top 10 entries (40), exceeding Madonna (38). In the United Kingdom, the song reached number seven on OCC's Audio Streaming Chart and received a silver certification by the British Phonographic Industry (BPI). It charted at number five on the Canadian Hot 100 and was certified platinum by Music Canada. In Australia, the song peaked at number five on ARIA Top 50 Singles chart and received a gold certification from the Australian Recording Industry Association (ARIA).

"Midnight Rain" reached national record charts worldwide, at number two in the Philippines, number three in Singapore, number four in Malaysia, number six in Vietnam, number 10 in India and Portugal, number 13 in South Africa, number 14 in Iceland, number 19 in Luxembourg, number 22 in Czech Republic and Lithuania, number 26 in Switzerland,  number 28 in Slovakia and Sweden, number 33 in Denmark, number 35 in Norway, number 37 in Hungary, number 50 in Spain, number 52 in Austria, number 84 in Italy, number 92 in Germany, number 94 in Argentina, and number 111 in France. The song ultimately peaked at number five on the Billboard Global 200 chart.

Recording and personnel 
Credits are adapted from Pitchfork.

Recording
 Recorded at Rough Customer Studio (Brooklyn) and Electric Lady Studios (New York City)
 Mixed at MixStar Studios (Virginia Beach)
 Mastered at Sterling Sound (Edgewater, New Jersey)

Personnel
 Taylor Swift – vocals, songwriter, producer
 Jack Antonoff – songwriter, producer, modular synths, Juno 6, Moog, Prophet 5, drums, programming, percussion, recording
 Laura Sisk – recording
 Megan Searl – assistant engineer
 Jon Sher – assistant engineer
 John Rooney – assistant engineer
 Randy Merrill – mastering engineer
 Serban Ghenea – mix engineer
 Bryce Bordone – assistant mix engineer

Charts

Certifications

Notes

References

2022 songs
Taylor Swift songs
Electropop songs
Songs written by Taylor Swift
Songs written by Jack Antonoff
Song recordings produced by Taylor Swift
Song recordings produced by Jack Antonoff